Dalbandin (Urdu and ) is a city and the headquarter of District Chagai in the province of Balochistan near the Iran and Afghanistan border. It has a population of 16,319, and the remainder of the entire Dalbandin Tehsil has a population of 110,503. It is located at an altitude of 843 m (2769 ft). Dalbandin is famous for fruit orchards and more.
Dalbandin Airport is a small domestic airport located southwest of the city.

Etymology

The name of city has a little story. Before the advent of the British  into the Sub-Continent, the territory was known as Naalbandin. The people in this area were expert farriers, that were regionally known Naalbandin. But the English people could not properly pronounce the word Naalbandin and modified it into Dalbandin.

Climate
Dalbandin has a hot desert climate (Köppen climate classification BWh) with extremely hot summers and cool winters. The climate is dry whole the year but some rain does fall in the winter.

2011 Earthquake
The 7.2  Dalbandin earthquake shook a remote region of Balochistan on 19 January 2011. The dip-slip shock had a maximum Mercalli intensity of VI (Strong), caused moderate damage, and left three dead and several injured.Fortunately the town was not too much damaged.

2016 US drone strike
Taliban leader Mullah Akhtar Mansour was killed in a convoy next to the town by a U.S. drone strike on 21 May 2016.

See also
 Dalbandin Airport
 Dalbandin railway station

References

Populated places in Chagai District
Provincially Administered Tribal Areas of Balochistan, Pakistan